Phyciodes mylitta, the Mylitta crescent or Mylitta crescentspot, is a butterfly of the family Nymphalidae. It is found in western North America.

The wingspan is 26-37 mm. Wings are orange with black markings and white fringe on the edges. The females are darker than the males. The butterfly flies from June until late July in Canada and until fall in California. It is found in a variety of habitats, and usually inhabits meadows and stream banks in forested areas. 

The larvae are black with spines and white markings. They feed on Cirsium and Carduus species. Adults feed on flower nectar.

Subspecies
Listed alphabetically:
P. m. arizonensis Bauer, 1975
P. m. arida (Skinner, 1917)
P. m. mexicana Hall, 1928
P. m. mylitta
P. m. thebais Godman & Salvin, 1878

Similar species
Phyciodes pallida – pale crescent

References

External links
Species Phyciodes mylitta - Mylitta Crescent, BugGuide

Melitaeini
Butterflies of North America
Butterflies described in 1861
Taxa named by William Henry Edwards